Charolais (also Charollais) is a historic region of France, named after the central town of Charolles, and located in today's Saône-et-Loire département, in Burgundy.

History
It was held by the French noble house of Chalon-Arlay, until in 1237 Count John the Old ceded it to Duke Hugh IV of Burgundy. The county of Charolais was inherited by Hugh's granddaughter Beatrice, who in 1272 married Count Robert of Clermont, a younger son of King Louis IX of France and progenitor of the House of Bourbon. In 1314 it passed to Robert's second son John, whose daughter Beatrice married Count John I of Armagnac in 1327.

John's grandson Count Bernard VII of Armagnac sold the county to Duke Philip II of Burgundy in 1390. It thus became part of the Duchy of Burgundy and the title 'Count of Charolais' was systematically given to the heir apparent of the incumbent duke. After the death of the last Valois-Burgundy duke Charles the Bold at the 1477 Battle of Nancy, the county was seized by King Louis XI of France–against the fierce resistance by the Habsburg archduke Maximilian I of Austria, husband of Charles' daughter Mary. The same year however, loyal to the duchess Mary, daughter of Charles the Bold, the County of Charolais rebelled and expelled the french. After the War of the Burgundian Succession, Charolais legally returned to the Habsburg dynasty according to the 1493 Treaty of Senlis, though it remained a French fief. Isolated in French lands the County of Charolais, former inheritance of the heir of the ducal throne, remained the last reminder of the Burgundian independence, when Burgundy was ruled by the most powerful, rich and sophisticated men of their times, the Great Dukes of Burgundy of House Valois-Burgundy, also known as the Great Dukes of the West. 

The County of Charolais shared a common history with the Imperial County of Burgundy (Franche-Comté), as both belonged to the dowry of Maximilian's daughter Margaret of Austria. Upon her death in 1530, they passed to her nephew Emperor Charles V and with the Imperial estates of the Burgundian Circle (the Spanish Netherlands) were held by Habsburg Spain under Charles' son Philip II from 1569 onwards.

While the County of Burgundy fell to the French Crown upon the 1678 Treaty of Nijmegen, Charolais was acquired by the Bourbon prince Louis of Condé in 1684. It was not awarded to the French Crown until the death of Count Charles of Charolais in 1760, when Louis XV incorporated it into the Estates of Burgundy.

References 

 Hubert Elie, Le Charolais dans l’histoire européenne (Lyon, 1956),

 
History of Burgundy
Geography of Saône-et-Loire
Historical regions
Bourgogne-Franche-Comté region articles needing translation from French Wikipedia